Música sertaneja or sertanejo is a music style that had its origins in the countryside of Brazil in the 1920s. Its contemporary developments made it the most popular music style in 2000s and 2010s Brazil, particularly throughout the southern/southeastern and center-western countryside Brazil. Subgenres include sertanejo raiz, sertanejo romântico, and sertanejo universitário.

Sertanejo songs have been, since the 1990s, the most played music genre on Brazilian radio, constantly topping the Brazilian music charts. Additionally, from 2000 to 2003 and since 2009, música sertaneja albums have been granted a specific category at the Latin Grammy Awards.

Many sertanejo artists are duos, at times formed by siblings, typically singing vocal harmonies, especially major thirds, and employing frequent vibrato. Men have traditionally dominated the scene, although some women such as Paula Fernandes, and Maria Cecília, and Simone & Simaria have achieved mainstream success in the 21st century.

A subgenre, called "sertanejo universitário" (college sertanejo), has developed from the mid-2000s on, consisting of a more stripped-down, acoustic-oriented use of the guitars influenced by Western pop music. It has grown very popular among Brazilian youth nationwide and has dominated the sertanejo scene.

Background

"Sertanejo" is derived from sertão, a general term for rural backlands away from coastal metropolitan regions, although sertão itself is also often used in a narrow sense referring to the interior away from the Brazilian Northeast. Sertanejo differs from the caipira culture, specifically originating in the area that comprises the states of São Paulo, Minas Gerais, Goias, Mato Grosso, Mato Grosso do Sul and Paraná. "Música caipira" or "música sertaneja" refers to the music that is composed and performed in rural areas, like the old 'moda de viola'. The instruments used by solo musicians or duos are typical of colonial Brazil, such as the viola caipira (guitar) .

First era

It was at the end of the 1920s that Brazilian country music as we know it today came into being. It was born from recordings made by journalist and writer Cornélio Pires of "tales" and fragments of traditional songs in the interior of the state of São Paulo in the countryside of Minas Gerais, north and west of Paraná, Goiás and Mato Grosso southeast. At the time of these pioneering recordings, the genre was known as música caipira, whose lyrics evoke the lifestyle of the country man (often in opposition to man's life in the city) and the bucolic beauty of the landscape and romantic countryside (currently this type of composition is classified as "sertanejo de raiz" (roots sertanejo), with emphasized words in daily life and manner of singing).
Beyond Cornelio Pires and his "Caipira Gang" stood out in this trend, recording at a later time, duo Mandi and Sorocabinha, Alvarenga and Ranchinho, and Florencio Torres, Tonico and Tinoco, Vieira and Vieirinha, among others, and popular songs like "Sergio Forero", by Cornelio Pires, "Bonde Camarão" by Cornelio Pires and Mariano, "Sertão do Laranjinha" by Pires and Ariovaldo and "Cabocla Teresa", by João Pires and Ariovaldo Pacifico.

Second era

A new phase in the history of sertanejo music began after the Second World War, with the addition of new styles (of duets with various intervals and the mariachi-style), genres (initially guarânia and Paraguayan polka, and later, the Mexican corrido and ranchera) and instruments (such as the accordion and harp). The theme gradually shifted to love and romance, however, a certain autobiographical character was kept.

Some highlights of this era were the duos Cascatinha e Inhana, Irmãs Galvão, Irmãs Castro, Sulino e Marrueiro, Palmeira and Biá, the trio Luizinho, Limeira e Zezinha (launchers of music campeira) and singer José Fortuna (adapter guarânia ~ Brazil) . Throughout the 1970s, the duo Milionário & Jose Rico systematized the use of elements of traditional Mexican mariachi with violin and trumpet flourishes to fill spaces between sentences and strokes of the glottis which produces a sobbing voice. Other names, such as duo Pena Branca & Xavantinho, followed the ancient tradition of rustic, while the singer Tião Carreiro innovated by fusing the genre with samba, coco and calango de roda.

Third era

The introduction of the electric guitar and pop music influences by duo Leo Canhoto e Robertinho in the late 1960s marked the start of modern sertanejo music. One member of the Jovem Guarda musical movement, singer Sergio Reis switched from pop to sertanejo in the 1970, which contributed to a wider acceptance of the genre. Renato Teixeira was another important artist in this period.

At that time sertanejo music was usually performed in circuses, rodeos, and AM radio stations. Early as the 1980s, this penetration extended to FM radio and also on television – either in weekly programs on Sunday morning or even making it into soap operas soundtracks or special one-off TV programs.

During the 1980s, there was a mass commercial exploitation of sertanejo, coupled in some cases, to a rereading of international hits and even the Jovem Guarda's. In this new romantic trend of country music countless artists emerged, almost always in pairs, among which, Trio Parada Dura, Chitãozinho & Xororó, Leandro e Leonardo, Zeze Di Camargo e Luciano, Chrystian & Ralf, João Paulo & Daniel, Chico Rey & Parana, João Mineiro and Marciano, Gian and Giovani, Rick & Renner, Gilberto e Gilmar, Alan e Aladim, along with some female singers, such as Roberta Miranda, Aula Miranda and Nalva Aguiar. Some of the successes of this phase are "Fio de Cabelo", by Marciano and Darci Rossi, "Apartmento 37 ", Leo Canhoto, "Pense em Mim, " Douglas in May, "Entre Tapas e Beijos", Nilton Lamas and Antonio Bueno and "Evidências", by Jose Augusto and Paulo Sérgio Valle.

Against this trend of more commercial country music, names like the duo Pena Branca e Xavantinho reappeared, adapting to the language of MPB success of guitars, and new artists emerged like Almir Sater, a sophisticated guitar player, who moved among the styles of guitar and the blues. In the following decade, a new generation of sertanejo artists, including Roberto Correa, Ivan Vilela, Pereira da Viola, and Chico Lobo e Miltinho Edilberto, emerged who were willing to reunite the caipira traditions. The recording industry therefore launched a similar movement in the 2000s called sertanejo universitário, with names like Marcos & Leo, Joao Bosco & Vinicius, César Menotti & Fabiano, Jorge & Mateus, Victor & Leo, Fernando & Sorocaba, Marcos & Belutti, João Neto & Frederico. As this movement wins more supporters, the market formerly focused on that the advent of sertanejo artists and duos in Goias state, has today elected new idols in the state of Mato Grosso do Sul such as Luan Santana and Maria Cecilia & Rodolfo. However, Goiás has not failed to reveal big names on the national scene, it appeared the aforementioned Jorge & Mateus and João Neto e Frederico. Not to mention the artists linked to the more massive sertanejo of the previous decade, as Guilherme & Santiago, Bruno & Marrone and Edson & Hudson.

Fourth era

Starts recycling sertanejo universitário, the artists get the music division, a good part returns to the influences of moda de viola or "moda" as the artists are choosing to call the new segment is emerging, and CDS with the caption "just fashion". Yet another part follows the trends of the past romantic sertão that is the case of artists like Eduardo Costa e Léo Magalhães.
In the fourth era, the lyrics no longer talk only about failed relationships, but also about women, drinking, love affairs and sex, and there is influence from funk and samba/pagode.

Sertanejo universitário

Sertanejo Universitário is a Brazilian musical style that comes from a mix of Sertanejo, segments of freestyle with touches of beats coming from arrocha and vanerão. It is considered the third segment in the evolution of música sertaneja, coming after sertanejo roots and romantic sertanejo, very popular between the decades of the 1980s and 1990s. Simple songs dominate the style, and those sung by two singers of the genre, who are overwhelmingly young and considered "College Kids (Universitario)." Instead of traditional accordions and violins, synthesizers and electric guitars started to be used more frequently in this style of music. This variation differentiates itself from sertanejo as it has more elements of pop, and informal language.

This subgenre is sung, and is more popular with, people attending college, this being the reason behind the name of this variation. This is the style of music played at university parties, like "Ai se eu te pego!" by Michel Teló, who found international success with the genre. This variation of sertanejo has more elements of pop as compared with others.

This specific style has found favour internationally. Besides the massive success of "Ai se eu te pego!" on many charts, hits that have found commercial success in Europe and elsewhere include "Bara Bará Bere Berê, "Balada", "Eu Quero Tchu, Eu Quero Tcha" and "Lê Lê Lê".

Origins
The style had surged during the middle of the first decade of 2000, through the experience of sertanejo singers that had fused the traditional rhythms with other musical elements. One of the first duos to develop the style were João Bosco and Vinícius. The eruption onto the national scene was in 2005, when the single "Leilão", of the duo César Menotti and Fabiano became a hit.

History
The interaction between the countryside and the cities in the academic sphere contributed to the surge of an individual style. Having violas and guitars disseminated on campuses and student residences, the old sertaneja music ending up joining the violas and guitars with modern instruments such as electric guitars, bass guitars, batteries, brass instruments, and percussion.

The initial result was a new twist to the old and classic sertaneja roots, which over the course of the years starting distancing themselves from their earlier styles, and acquiring their own identity. In this new century the musical influences of the youth in the interior also gradually became mixed with other styles, especially with pop, arrocha, and funk carioca, styles that are predominantly seen in parties organized by university students.

Rocked by great popular appeal among the youth of both sexes, the new segment has won a lot of attention in the media. Simple music and lyrics, dance beats, and refrains that are easily memorized automatically, generating a large "boom" in style, causing it to leave the restricted University environment and spread to radios and festivals all over Brazil. The repercussions and success of the genre is seen as every day new duos and sertanejo groups are on the rise.

Themes
Due to its rise after the second evolution of sertanejo (Romantic Sertanejo), this style does not come with regional lyrics and situations lived by rural people (like in Sertanejo roots). Usually, the lyrics talk about situations that ordinarily occur in the lives of young people, having a strong appeal towards themes of betrayal, drunkenness, ostentation.

Singers and songs
Sertanejo Universitario found young people in their search for growth, bringing focus to music that speaks of love and ballads. Today, new singers emerge as other adopt the style, and every day the genre becomes more and more popular. Examples of this expansion of Sertanejo Universitario is music like Michel Telo with the hit, that became an international fever, "Ai Se Eu Te Pego", Gusttavo Lima with the song "Balada", Jorge & Mateus with "Amo Noite e Dia", João Neto & Frederico with "Le Le Le", Luan Santana with "Sogrão Caprichou", Munhoz & Mariano with the music Camaro Amarelo, Cristiano Araujo with "Efeitos" and Thaeme & Thiago with "Hoje Não".

Gusttavo Lima is one of the best known names in Sertanejo Universitario in Brazil.

Stylistic Origins: Sertanejo, Caipira Music, Arrocha, Forro, Brega, Tecnobrega, Pop, Embolada, and Vanerao.

Cultural Context: Interior of the South-East, Center-West, and South of Brazil.

Traditional Instruments:Guitar, Electric Guitar, Country Violin, Twelve-String Guitar, Double Bass (4 or 6 cord), Accordion, Keyboard, Piano, Drums, Percussion and Saxophone

Popularity: In all of Brazil, and in various parts of Europe, Latin America, and the United States.

Derivative forms
Sertanejo  
Arrocha

Subgenres

Caipira (or Sertanejo Roots)  
Romantic Sertanejo  
Sertanejo Pop, Sertanejo Arrocha

List of sertanejo artists
(selective, alphabetical order)
(Artists with considerable crossover European and international success indicated with * asterisk)

Solos
Cristiano Araújo
Daniel
Marília Mendonça
Alex Ferrari*
Gusttavo Lima*
Sérgio Reis
Leo Rodriguez*
Luan Santana*
Paula Fernandes*
Michel Teló*

Duos
Bruno e Marrone
Chitãozinho & Xororó
Fernando & Sorocaba
Henrique e Juliano
João Lucas & Marcelo
João Neto e Frederico*
Jorge & Mateus
Leandro e Leonardo
Maria Cecília & Rodolfo
Rick & Renner
Thaeme & Thiago
Tião Carreiro & Pardinho
Tonico & Tinoco
Victor e Leo
Zezé Di Camargo & Luciano

International sertanejo hits
(selected)
"Ai Se Eu Te Pego!" by Michel Teló
"Balada" by Gusttavo Lima
"Bara Bará Bere Berê" – Three versions by Alex Ferrari, Leo Rodriguez and Michel Teló
"Eu Quero Tchu, Eu Quero Tcha" by Flavel & Neto
"Lê Lê Lê" by João Neto & Frederico

See also
Latin Grammy Award for Best Sertaneja Music Album
List of Brazilian musicians
Música sertaneja musicians
Pagode (music)

References

External links 

 Música Sertaneja – Dicionário Cravo Albin da Música Popular Brasileira
 Fazenda Country website (on Música sertaneja / Fazenda Country Facebook
Pantanal Escapes – Music and Culture of Brazil's Pantanal Region (includes links to selected video clips)
Sertanejo page on 1wxrld.com

Brazilian styles of music
Lusophone music
Country music genres
Brazilian country music